The following lists events in 1914 in Iceland.

Incumbents
Prime Minister – Hannes Hafstein (until 21 July), Sigurður Eggerz (from 21 July)

Events

Eimskip was founded.
Fossafélagið Títan was founded.
Statistics Iceland was formed.

Births
22 April – Sigurður Sigurðsson, athlete (d. 1982).
16 June – Lúðvík Jósepsson, politician (d. 1994).
2 July – Sveinn Ingvarsson, sprinter (d. 2009).
19 August – Baldur Möller, chess player (d. 1999).
20 September – Vilhjálmur Hjálmarsson, politician (d. 2014).
7 October – Hermann Hermannsson, footballer (d. 1975)

Deaths
3 June – Jón Bjarnason, Lutheran minister (b. 1845)

Full date missing
 Þorsteinn Erlingsson, poet (b. 1858).

References

 
Iceland
Iceland
Years of the 20th century in Iceland